The National Highway 125 or the N-125 is one of Pakistan National Highway running from Taxila to the town of Haripur via Khanpur in Khyber Pakhtunkhwa province of Pakistan. Its total length is 44 km, the highway is maintained and operated by Pakistan's National Highway Authority.

See also

References

External links
 National Highway Authority

Roads in Pakistan